Miri Airport  is an airport located  south east of Miri, a city in the Malaysian state of Sarawak. The airport is the sixth-busiest airport in Malaysia, and the second-busiest in Sarawak.

Miri Airport is a major hub for MASWings Twin Otter which took over most of the mainly rural domestic services from FlyAsianXpress. The location in the middle of Malaysian Borneo and close to the border of Brunei makes it a suitable hub for rural air services and an important gateway to Sarawak. In 2014, Miri Airport is the sixth-busiest airport in terms of aircraft movements and the sixth-busiest in terms of passengers handled, there were 2,363,080 passenger movements, and 49,204 aircraft movements in the airport.

Miri Airport is the second largest airport in Sarawak after Kuching International Airport, with a terminal floor space of 16,448m². Miri Airport is not recognised by Department of Civil Aviation (DCA) Malaysia and Malaysia Airports Holdings Berhad (MAHB) as an international airport despite having scheduled international flights daily.

History
As the population of Miri Town grew, the need for a larger airport forced the government to search for a new site to relieve the traffic at Lutong Airport. A site to the south-east of the town centre was selected. Miri Airport was fully functional post-1985.

Facilities
Situated in Jalan, Miri Airport is 9.5 km (5.9 mi) south-east of Miri's city centre. Miri Airport is the busiest domestic airport in Malaysia in terms of passenger and aircraft movement. The airport has a terminal which can accommodate up to 2 million passengers annually. By end 2019, Miri airport capacity will be increased to 3 million passenger per annum.

Airport terminal
The two-storey terminal building is able to handle up to 2 million passengers per annum. The terminal has been operating beyond its designed limits since 2012. There are a total of 15 check-in counters, of which six are Malaysia Airlines/MASwings check-in counters and four are for AirAsia. There are also Malaysia Airlines/MASwings and AirAsia self check-in kiosks, located near the side entrance of the airport. The terminal is equipped with a total of three conveyor belts in the baggage reclaim hall.

Several shops and dining outlets can be found in the airport, including Starbucks, Marrybrown and Famous Amos. Malaysia Airlines/MASwings and AirAsia each has a sales office in the airport. Malindo Air initially maintained its sales office on the first floor of the airport, just outside the departure hall, even though it has suspended flights to Miri from Kuala Lumpur indefinitely. A few months later, Malindo's sales office in Miri closed. July 1, 2016 witnessed the official resumption of Kuala Lumpur-Miri flight by Malindo. Barely a few months later, Malindo Air once again terminated its route from Miri to Kuala Lumpur in April 2017.

There are two aprons in the airport: Apron 'A' and Apron 'B'. The expansion of Apron 'B' was completed in 2014. The aprons underwent yet another expansion in 2015 and were completed on 3 March 2016. The expansion allows 4 additional parking bays for code C aircraft (i.e. Boeing 737 or Airbus A320 and equivalent) and 6 for ATR 72. All existing taxiways, gates and parking bays were renamed after the expansion and upgrades. The apron can now accommodate 7 code C aircraft, 1 Airbus A330 or Boeing 777, 9 ATR 72s and 4 de Havilland Canada DHC-6 Twin Otters at any given time. Gates A1 - 3 in apron 'A' were renamed Gates 2 - 4 (parking bays 2 - 4), with a new addition of Gate 5 which consists of bays 5 - 8. All gates are for code C aircraft, except for Gate 4 which is optimised for widebody aircraft like Airbus A330 or Boeing 777. Apron 'B' is restricted to Fokker F50 and ATR 72 aircraft or smaller (i.e. DHC-6 Twin Otter) and is primarily used by MASwings, except for parking bay 1 (formerly parking bay B1), which is used for code C aircraft. Gates B and C in apron 'B' were renamed to Gate 1 consisting of parking bays 1 and R1 - R13 (parking bays R1 - 3 were former parking bays B2 - B4 while bays R10 - R13 were initially bays C1 - C4). Parking bays R4 - R9 are new additional parking bays. For the comfort of passengers boarding and disembarking ATR 72s or DHC-6s, 3-fingered piers with covered walkways were also constructed in apron 'B', based on the walkways found in Low cost carrier terminal (LCCT) of Kuala Lumpur International Airport (KLIA) that is now closed.

Runway and taxiways
Miri Airport is serviced with a 2,745 m × 60 m (9,006 ft × 197 ft) runway, designated Runway 02/20, and a partial, parallel taxiway at a width of 23 m (75 ft). Runway 20 is equipped with high intensity simple approach lights whereas Runway 02 has high-intensity Cat 1 precision approach lights installed. Other aids include: ILS, DVOR/DME, NDB and PAPI (slope 3°). Taxiways A3, B1 and C1 that connects the runway, Apron 'A' and Apron 'B' with Taxiway A were finished after the 2016 expansion.

Hangars
There is a hangar for general aviation and an Awan Inspirasi hangar 500 m from the terminal building. The general aviation apron GA2 is a small distance away from GA1 apron, which was completed in 2011. The Awan Inspirasi hangar and GA2 were designed to accommodate 4 helicopters up to Sikorsky S92. MASkargo and Gading Sari each maintains a hangar less than 50 m away from the terminal building.

Immigration
Sarawak controls its own immigration autonomy. The exercised laws require all passengers travelling with any flights from outside Sarawak (including all flights from Peninsular Malaysia, the state of Sabah, Federal Territory of Labuan and other countries) to go through the immigration screening at the first entry of any Sarawakian airport.

Hornbill Skyways has a regional office at Miri Airport.

Airlines and destinations

Passenger

Cargo

Traffic and statistics

Traffic

Statistics

Expansion and upgrades
The number of passengers visiting Miri has grown steadily over the years since the upgrading of the terminal. Calls to upgrade the gateway to northern Sarawak have been voiced as the airport slowly reaches its maximum capacity. On 6 December 2011, the Minister of Transport Datuk Abdul Rahim Bakri said that Miri Airport will be expanded further to cater for the growing volume of passengers and cargo passing through it. The expansion project would be implemented under the 11th Malaysia Plan following the increase in air passengers using the airport which was projected to reach two million within the next two years. The airport recorded an increase of 9.75 per cent in passenger traffic during the first nine months of 2011, with 1.35 million passengers using the airport compared with 1.23 million during the same period in the previous year. Cargo traffic also increased 18.69 per cent during the period under review from 4,849 metric tons to 5,756 metric tons. Miri Airport is the busiest domestic airport in Malaysia in terms of passenger and aircraft movement.

Prime Minister Datuk Seri Najib Tun Razak tabled the 2014 Budget in October 2013 and it was announced that Miri Airport would be among the five airports in the state and Sabah to be upgraded with a RM312 million allocation. The other airports were Sibu and Mukah Airports and Kota Kinabalu and Sandakan Airports. Lee also pointed out the need for the airport to have separate terminals catering to domestic and international and rural air services. This includes separate check-in counters and the departure and arrival lounges. The allocation is also said to improve passenger comfort at the airports.

Passenger traffic continued to grow in 2014. Appeals to upgrade the airport to cater for the growing numbers using Miri Airport were frequently voiced. Miri Airport handles more than 4,000 flights a month, with an average of 125 aircraft landings and take-offs daily, including 62 landings for rural services; with the current airport size, arrival times for incoming flights will be delayed because they have to wait for other aircraft to depart before being able to land on the runway. Traffic congestion during peak hours also poses a problem. An urgent meeting was held by Sarawak Communication Assistant Minister Datuk Lee Kim Shin regarding these matters. There are also talks to introduce more international routes into Miri to further boost the city's economy and to break the tourism bottleneck experienced in Miri as the only international route (Miri-Singapore) is inadequate at present.

On 15 December 2014, Lee announced that Miri Airport would be getting RM78 million for its extension work, including the extension of the current runway and the aircraft parking apron. Once the extension was completed, the parking apron would be able to accommodate 8 Boeing aircraft and equivalent, 9 ATR 72 and 4 DHC-6 Twin Otter. The extension project also included installing four additional aerobridges, constructing an additional runway, constructing rooftop walkways for domestic passengers and improving the drainage system. The design of the walkways will be based on the walkways found in the now-closed low cost carrier terminal (LCCT) at Kuala Lumpur International Airport (KLIA).

Due to its outdated style, on 25 April 2016, Malaysia's Former Transport Minister Liow Tiong Lai sent a proposal to the Ministry of Finance to upgrade the status of Miri Airport to an international airport.

Incidents
 On 6 September 1997, Royal Brunei Airlines Flight 238 crashed short of the runway at Miri Airport. All 10 persons on board were killed.

Pan Borneo Highway project
As part of the project, Miri Airport will have its interchange that will smoothen the traffic from the airport to Miri city. It was the part of the final work package contract (WPC 11), connects Sungai Tangap to Pujut Link Road. The main contractor of this WPC is Konsortium KPE Sdn Bhd.

References

External links 

 Miri Airport, Sarawak at Malaysia Airports Holdings Berhad
 
 

Airports in Sarawak
Miri, Malaysia